Sahnewal is a city and a municipal council  in Ludhiana district in the Indian state of Punjab. The city is situated on National Highway No. 44, between Khanna and Ludhiana.

Demographics
At the 2001 India census, Sahnewal had a population of 17,248. Males constituted 54% of the population and females 46%. At that time, Sahnewal had an average literacy rate of 61%, lower than the national average of 70%: male literacy was 64% and female literacy was 58%. 12% of the population were under 6 years of age.

Sahnewal is also the hometown of actor Dharmendra

References

Cities and towns in Ludhiana district